The Boyne-class ships of the line were a class of two 98-gun second rates, ordered in 1783 and designed for the Royal Navy by Sir Edward Hunt.

Ships

Builder: Woolwich Dockyard
Ordered: 21 January 1783
Laid down: 4 November 1783
Launched: 27 June 1790
Completed: 21 November 1790
Fate: Burnt, 1 May 1795

Builder: Portsmouth Dockyard
Ordered: 29 November 1783
Laid down: May 1784
Launched: 28 June 1794
Completed: 27 December 1794
Fate: Broken up, December 1822

References

Lavery, Brian (2003) The Ship of the Line - Volume 1: The development of the battlefleet 1650-1850. Conway Maritime Press. .
Winfield, Rif (2007) British Warships in the Age of Sail 1714-1792: Design, Construction, Careers and Fates. Seaforth Publishing. .

 
Ship of the line classes